Worsley was a parliamentary constituency represented in the House of Commons of the Parliament of the United Kingdom. It elected one Member of Parliament (MP) by the first past the post system of election.

Boundaries
1983–1997: The City of Salford wards of Cadishead, Irlam, Little Hulton, Walkden North, Walkden South, and Worsley and Boothstown, and the Metropolitan Borough of Wigan wards of Bedford-Astley and Tyldesley East.

1997–2010: The City of Salford wards of Little Hulton, Walkden North, Walkden South, and Worsley and Boothstown, and the Metropolitan Borough of Wigan wards of Bedford-Astley, Hindsford, and Tyldesley East.

The constituency was created in 1983 from parts of the seats of Leigh, Newton and Farnworth. This was a safe Labour seat including mostly working-class areas from the boroughs of Salford and Wigan, including Walkden, Little Hulton, Astley and Irlam.  The only Tory areas of strength here ironically were Worsley itself and Boothstown.

Boundary review
Following its review of parliamentary representation in Greater Manchester, the Boundary Commission for England recommended that Worsley be merged into a new constituency of Worsley and Eccles South. That constituency was first fought at the 2010 general election.

The previous link between Salford and Wigan for parliamentary purposes has been broken, hence the requirement to alter the existing Worsley seat. The Wigan Borough wards were returned to the Leigh constituency.

Members of Parliament

Elections

Elections in the 1980s

Elections in the 1990s

Elections in the 2000s

See also
 List of parliamentary constituencies in Greater Manchester

References

Parliamentary constituencies in North West England (historic)
Parliamentary constituencies in Greater Manchester (historic)
Constituencies of the Parliament of the United Kingdom established in 1983
Constituencies of the Parliament of the United Kingdom disestablished in 2010
Politics of Salford
Politics of the Metropolitan Borough of Wigan